Platte County is the name of three counties in the United States:

 Platte County, Missouri
 Platte County, Nebraska
 Platte County, Wyoming
 Platte County, Colorado Territory, an unorganized county of the Territory of Colorado from 1872 to 1874